James Amos Porter (December 22, 1905 – February 28, 1970)  was an African-American art historian, artist and teacher. He is best known for establishing the field of African-American art history and was influential in the African American Art movement.

Early life and education 
Porter was born  in Baltimore, Maryland on Dec 22, 1905. His father was an African Methodist Episcopal minister and his mother was a teacher. His brother John taught him to paint. He attended schools in Washington D.C. between 1918 and 1923, and later attended Howard University. Under the direction of James V. Herring, head of the Art Department at Howard University, Porter studied painting, drawing, and art history. Porter graduated from Howard University in 1926. He also studied for a degree at Teachers College, Columbia University.

Upon graduation, Porter accepted a position as instructor of painting and drawing at Howard University. He later became chairman of the art department, a position he held until his death in 1970. Porter attended The Art Institute of New York City. He later studied at the Art Students League of New York. Porter received a scholarship in 1935 from the Institute of International Education and was the recipient of a Rockefeller Foundation grant that allowed him to study art in Europe. He studied Baroque art  at the Institute of Art and Archeology at the Sorbonne. He returned to the United States where he attended New York University, graduating in 1937 with a master's degree in art history. Porter's master's thesis, later the subject for his influential book, Modern Negro Art, focused on African-American art and artists.

Career
Porter taught at Howard University for more than forty years, together with artists such as James Lesesne Wells and Lois Mailou Jones. He headed the Art Department, and served as Director of the Art Gallery from 1953 through 1970. David Driskell, one of Porter's students at Howard, recalled in an interview with Xavier Nicholas that he was the only student in his "Negro Art" class one semester but "He taught that course as though he had a hundred students there, and I was the only one."

He published Modern Negro Art in 1943, the first comprehensive study in the United States of African-American art. Porter decisively placed African-American artists within the framework of American art.  He was the first to recognize and document the significant contributions these artists made to the history of American art. With Porter's systematic approach, Modern Negro Art became and still is the foundation of African-American art history and for later texts. Porter's interest in nearly forgotten and often ignored artists of African descent was sparked by reading a brief article on African-American landscape artist Robert Scott Duncanson. Due to the account's brevity, Porter followed his curiosity to research Duncanson and other artists of African descent.

Porter was the recipient of a grant from the Rockefeller Foundation in 1945. He took a leave of absence from teaching and spent a year in Cuba from 1945 to 1946, studying art and culture in Cuba and Haiti.  In Haiti, Porter's subjects included the peasant class and landscapes of the country. While his work in Haiti focused on similar subjects as other Black artists who turned to Haiti for inspiration, such as William E. Scott and Aaron Douglas, his approach to the subject matter differed. He did not paint his Haitian subjects as simply picturesque and created monumental figures of the "market women" he saw. Porter's paintings and writing encouraged Americans to resist the urge upon traveling to Haiti and getting lost in the picturesque quality it holds on the surface.  In an essay Porter wrote in 1946 for Opportunity Magazine entitled "Picturesque Haiti" he wrote, "It is altogether too easy to make the aesthetic blunder so easily made in the presence of the new and the strange, that is, to say of Haitian life or landscape, 'Oh, how picturesque!' " While his paintings made in Haiti showcased the same characters as other artists at the time he surrounded this figures not with the bounty of an imagined tropical island but with urban debris. The representation of economic pressures and struggles that shaped the world of the Haitians he painted separates his work from other artists inspired by Haiti before him. His thorough research Haiti, Cuba, and West Africa, stimulated his creating courses at Howard in "Latin American Art" and "African Art and Architecture". In 1955, he was awarded a fellowship by the Belgium-American Art Seminar and studied Flemish and Dutch Art of the sixteenth thru the eighteenth century while in Belgium. With a grant from the newspaper, the Evening Star, Porter traveled to South Africa in 1963 to study West African architecture. He completed twenty-five paintings with South African themes during his time in the country.

Porter's work was shown in many group exhibitions during his forty year career. In 1940 his work was displayed at the American Negro Exposition in Chicago, and in 1948, he mounted a one-man exhibition of his work with the Barnett-Aden Gallery in Washington, D.C.

Personal life
During his studies, Porter met Dorothy Burnett, a librarian at the Harlem branch of the New York Public Library, where he did research. On December 27, 1929, Porter and Burnett were married.  They had one daughter, Constance Porter. They became professional as well as personal partners. Dorothy worked with Porter, providing bibliographic information critical to his investigations. Both worked at Howard University. Dorothy Porter was the director of Moorland Foundation, later known as the Moorland-Spingarn Research Center. She developed and catalogued information about African-American artists.

Honors and legacy 

 Recipient of the Schomburg Portrait Prize, from the Harmon Foundation, for the painting entitled Woman Holding a Jug (1930).
 Honored by President Lyndon Johnson, on the twenty-fifth anniversary of the founding of the National Gallery of Art as one of America's most outstanding men of the arts.
 In 1990 Howard University founded an academic colloquium named in Porter's honor and has since held it annually.  The Colloquium annually draws leading and emerging scholars in the field of study he helped establish. Presenters have included Porter students such as David Driskell and Tritobia Hayes Benjamin, along with other important scholars and artists, such as Lowery Stokes Sims, Richard A. Long, Richard Powell, Michael Harris, Judith Wilson, Samella Lewis, and Deborah Willis.

On February 25, 2010 Swann Galleries auctioned an immense archive of research material amassed by Porter; it consisted of photographs, letters, exhibit catalogues, art books, flyers, and bibliographical data on important African-American artists. Acquired by Emory University, the papers include correspondence from virtually every major African-American artist from the 1920s forward: Romare Bearden, Lois Mailou Jones, Meta Fuller, Elizabeth Catlett, Hughie Lee-Smith, and many others.

References

External links 
 Catalogue listing for Swann Galleries auction of Porter's Art History Reference archive
The art of James A. Porter
Stuart A. Rose Manuscript, Archives, and Rare Book Library, Emory University: James A. Porter papers, 1867-2009

1905 births
1970 deaths
African-American artists
Howard University alumni
University of Paris alumni
Artists from Baltimore
American art historians
New York University alumni
20th-century American historians
20th-century American male writers
Historians from Maryland
American male non-fiction writers
20th-century African-American writers
African-American male writers